The static interpretation of time is a view of time which arose in the early years of the 20th century from Albert Einstein's special relativity and Hermann Minkowski's extension of special relativity in which time and space were famously united in physicists' thinking as spacetime.

Essentially the universe is regarded as akin to a reel of film – which is a wholly static physical object – but which when played through a movie projector conjures a world of movement, color, light and change. In the static view our whole universe – our past, present, and future are fixed parts of that reel of film, and the projector is our consciousness.  But the 'happenings' of our consciousness have no objective significance – the objective universe does not happen, it simply exists in its entirety, albeit perceived from within as a world of changes.

The alternative, and commonly assumed view, is that the world unfolds in existence, that our present has some wider physical significance, because the universe evolves in step with it.

The static view is the simpler in that all that is held to exist is the physical ordering of the universe. All that there is at every time simply exists. The unfolding view requires an additional quality to the universe – that besides the physical ordering there is some quality of coming into and out of existence.

One can argue that the onus is therefore upon those who propose it, that the world unfolds, and that this additional quality they hold to (absent from special relativity) is indeed a physical feature of the world. There is however as yet no proof, experiment, or measurement, to show that our conscious experience of an unfolding present has any objective physical significance, or that the universe is anything other than static.

The static view is however commonly rejected for psychological, not scientific reasons, because it leads to a fatalistic or "fixed" conclusion about human existence – our 'past', 'present', and 'future' being what they are – there is no contingency in the world and no possibility of 'altering' or creating the future through some act of will – the future exists. It is simply that our consciousness has not yet reached it.

Quotes
 "The objective world simply is, it does not happen. Only to the gaze of my consciousness, crawling upward along the life line of my body, does a section of this world come to life as a fleeting image in space which continuously changes in time." —Hermann Weyl, Philosophy of Mathematics and Natural Science (Princeton University Press, Princeton, 1949)

See also
 Eternalism (philosophy of time)
 Falsifiability
 Four-dimensionalism
 Predeterminism
 Rietdijk–Putnam argument
 Superdeterminism
 Mathematical universe hypothesis

Further reading
 As well as providing an introduction to special relativity Durrell's textbook expresses the static view:
 Durrell, Clement V. Readable Relativity: A Book for Non-Specialists. L: G. Bell & Sons Ltd., 1927
 Discussion of this question can be found in books such as:
 The Concepts of Space and Time, edited by Milic Capek, Reidel Publishing Co., 1976

Metaphysical theories
Philosophy of time
Special relativity